Get AS was a Norwegian cable-TV operator and internet service provider. Get had its head office in Oslo, with local offices in Drammen, Greåker, Arendal, Kristiansand, Stavanger, Haugesund, Bergen, Trondheim and Stjørdal. Today, Telia operates a country-wide network under the Get brand. It has the second largest customer base of the providers in Norway. Until 2006, Get was a part of UPC Broadband. In September 2014, Get was purchased by Danish telecommunications company TDC A/S. In July 2018, Swedish telecom operator Telia Company has agreed to buy GET and TDC Norway for $2.6 billion. On 15 September 2020, the Get brand was phased out and replaced with the Telia brand.

External links
Get

References

Cable television companies
Cable television companies of Norway
Internet service providers of Norway
Television in Norway
Telecommunications companies of Norway
Companies based in Oslo
2018 mergers and acquisitions